Tyson Boyd Hinz (born October 12, 1991) is a former Canadian professional basketball player. Hinz played the power forward position, and last played for Mitteldeutscher BC of the German ProA.

College career
Hinz enjoyed a decorated career at Carleton University, winning four straight CIS championships with the Ravens. In 2011, Hinz was presented with the Mike Moser Memorial Trophy as the CIS Outstanding Player and won the Jack Donohue Trophy (MVP of CIS Championship) twice (2011, 2014). In 2011, Hinz also won the OUA and CIS Male Athlete of the Year award.

He received All-Canada First Team honours in 2011, 2012 and 2013 as well as Second Team honors in 2014.

In his last season with Carleton (2013–14), Hinz averaged 17 points and 6 rebounds per game. He was also named the CIS Tournament MVP and was named an Academic All-Canadian in the same season.

Professional career
Hinz started his professional career in the 2014–15 season, with Landstede Basketbal in the Netherlands. He finished 4th with Landstede, and the team was defeated in the playoff semifinals. Hinz averaged 13.1 points over the DBL regular season. He re-signed with Landstede for the 2015–16 season. That season, Hinz was named to the All-DBL Team.

On August 3, 2016, Hinz signed with Mitteldeutscher BC of the German second-tier ProA. Averaging 8.4 points and 3.9 rebounds in 18:18 minutes per contest, he helped them capture the 2017 ProA title.

International play 
Hinz competed with Team Canada in the 2011 Pan American Games in Mexico and was a key-part of Canada’s silver-winning squad at the 2011 World University Games in China. He averaged 15.9 points, 5.3 boards and 2.1 assists a game during the tournament, while receiving eurobasket.com All-World University Games First Team honors.

Statistics

Retirement 
Hinz ended his professional basketball career in 2017 and began a new career in digital marketing. Hinz is currently working for WebMarketers, a local digital marketing agency in Ottawa as an Account Executive.

References

1991 births
Living people
Basketball people from Quebec
Basketball players from Ottawa
Basketball players at the 2011 Pan American Games
Canadian men's basketball players
Carleton Ravens basketball players
Dutch Basketball League players
Landstede Hammers players
Pan American Games competitors for Canada
Power forwards (basketball)
Sportspeople from Sherbrooke
Universiade medalists in basketball
Universiade silver medalists for Canada
Medalists at the 2011 Summer Universiade